Bojmunte is a village in the city of Livno in Canton 10, the Federation of Bosnia and Herzegovina, Bosnia and Herzegovina.

Geography 

It is located between the villages of Čelebić and Radanovci at the beginning of a local road from the regional Livno–Bosansko Grahovo road.

Demographic history 

In 1991, the village population numbered 91 people, of whom all were ethnic Serbs. 

According to the 2013 census, its population was 19, all Serbs.

Footnotes

Bibliography 

 

Populated places in Livno
Serb communities in the Federation of Bosnia and Herzegovina